Kazakhs are a Turkic ethnic group and are among the 56 ethnic groups officially recognized by the People's Republic of China.

In China, there is one autonomous prefecture—the Ili Kazakh Autonomous Prefecture in the Xinjiang Uyghur Autonomous Region—and three Kazakh autonomous counties—Aksai Kazakh Autonomous County in Gansu, Barkol Kazakh Autonomous County, and Mori Kazakh Autonomous County in the Xinjiang Uyghur Autonomous Region.

History
During the fall of the Dzungar Khanate in the mid-18th century, the Manchus massacred the native Dzungar Oirat Mongols of Dzungaria (northern Xinjiang Province) in the Dzungar genocide, and afterwards colonized the depopulated area with immigrants from many parts of their empire. Among the peoples who moved into the depopulated Dzungaria were the Kazakhs from the Kazakh Khanates.

In the 19th century, the advance of the Russian Empire troops pushed the Kirghiz to neighboring countries. Russian settlers on traditional Kirghiz land drove many over the border to China, causing their population to increase in China. Comparatively, the Kirghiz received more benefits in the Chinese-controlled areas than the Russian-controlled areas. Russian settlers fought against the nomadic Kirghiz, which led the Russians to believe that the Kirghiz would be a liability in any conflict against China. The Muslim Kirghiz were certain that in an upcoming war, China would defeat Russia.

In the early 20th century, Kazakhs fled to China to escape Russian persecution and slaughter during the Basmachi movement in 1916. During the Russian Revolution, when Muslims faced tsarist conscription, Xinjiang again became a sanctuary for Kazakhs fleeing Russia. During the 1920s, hundreds of thousands of Kazakh nomads moved from Soviet Kazakhstan to Xinjiang to escape Soviet persecution, famine, violence, and forced sedentarization. Kazakhs that moved to China fought against the Soviet Communist-backed Uyghur Second East Turkestan Republic in the Ili Rebellion (1944–1949).

Toops estimated that 65,000 Kirghiz, 92,000 Hui, 326,000 Kazakh, 187,000 Han, and 2,984,000 Uyghur (totaling 3,730,000) lived in Xinjiang in 1941, and 4,334,000 people lived in Xinjiang according to Hoppe in 1949.

Kazakh exodus and tribal conflict 
A Kazakh chief named Khaisan was skinned alive and his heart cut out of his chest by the Oirat Mongol Ja Lama. His and another Kazakh's skin were used as a religious implement. The skins were found in Khaisan's yurt in Muunjaviin Ulaan on 8 February 1914 by Cossacks under Captain Bulatov. A White Guard soldier's heart was eaten by the Mongol Choijon Lama. Mongol banners were sprinkled with blood from the hearts of Russian White Guard and Chinese, according to A. V. Burdukov.

Owen Lattimore described Mongol Sandagdorjiyn Magsarjav (1877–1927) as "a strange, romantic and sometimes savage figure". Magsarjav had served under Ungern-Sternberg. In Uriankhai, Kazakh bandits who were captured had their hearts cut out and sacrificed by Magsarjav.

In 1936, after Sheng Shicai expelled 30,000 Kazakhs from Xinjiang to Qinghai, Hui Chinese led by General Ma Bufang massacred Kazakhs, until there were only 135 of them left.

Claims by other ethnic groups against Kazakhs
Being forced to migrate from Northern Xinjiang to the Kokonor plateau in Qinghai, the nomadic Kazakhs resorted to plundering and robbing as they passed through Gansu and northern Xinjiang. In 1941, General Ma Bufang agreed to settle the Kazakhs in several pasturelands in an attempt to avoid further conflicts and quell aggressions. However, with the Kokonor plateau being home to Hui, Tibetans, and Kazakhs, the tribes continued to periodically engage in conflict with each other. Hisao Kimura, a Japanese spy, cited a Tibetan Lama telling him that Kazakhs were enemies of the Tibetans: "This land, is very unsettled compared with Inner Mongolia. To the west, the Kazakhs persecute our people, and we are powerless to stop them." The Kazakhs who migrated to Iran and Pakistan via India and Tibet moved to Turkey in the 1950s, with some becoming guest workers in Germany in the 1960s.

During his travels in Qinghai, Office of Strategic Services agent Leonard Francis Clark reported that local Muslims told him about Kazakhs invading Tibet via the Nan Shan mountains in Xinjiang over the course of eight years in the 1940s. According to them, the Kazakhs were responsible for massacring 8,000 Buddhist Mongols during that period and claimed this was only possible due to the Chinese Nationalist Government disarming the Mongols. Further inquiries did not lead to more information and when Clark questioned missionaries in Lanchow, they only confirmed occasional raids from a few stray bands of Kazakhs over the last years.

Kazakh claims against other ethnic groups
From 1934 to 1938, Qumil Elisqan led about 18,000 Kerey Kazakhs to migrate to Gansu and Qinghai. Over the span of 2 years of battles, 5,000 Kazakhs were killed by Hui Muslim Chinese and Tibetans in Gansu. Led by Eliskhan Batur Elifuglu (1919–1943), the 13,000 survivors fled towards India in September 1940.

Tibetan troops robbed and killed Kazakhs 400 miles east of Lhasa at Chamdo when the Kazakhs were entering Tibet. To stop the migrants, a Tibetan cavalry numbering 1,000 attacked and fought the Kazakhs for three days in north Tibet, but ultimately lost. Afterwards, the Tibetan government sent the Kazakhs to the Ladakh region of Kashmir in British India. When they arrived at the Kashmir border, many Kazakhs died when the British ordered Indian guards to shoot. Once it was realized that they were civilians, the 3,039 surviving Kazakhs were let into India via Chuchul checkpoint in September 1941. Over these 3 years, 15,000 Kazakhs were killed.

When they were debriefed by British officials, the Kazakhs accused Tibetans and Tungans (Hui Chinese) of attacking them in Gansu, Qinghai, and Tibet. The Kazakhs said they were fleeing from the Soviets and the Soviet-backed warlord Sheng Shicai in Xinjiang. They accused Tibetan raiders of killing Kenzhebay, a relative of Elisqan, and accused the Hui-ruled Qinghai government of ignoring the murder. This incited them to move out of Qinghai towards India and Tibet. The Kazakhs accused Tibetan Qulïq people of being warlike and attacking the Kazakhs, and claimed that Kazakhs led by Elisqan had defeated them. The Kazakhs then accused a Hui Muslim (Dungan) called Fulušan of leading an assault with Mongol and Tibetan troops against the Kazakhs in Altïnšöke (Алтыншёке).

Upon crossing the border, however, the Kazakhs were unwelcome in Kashmir, and were confined to an open mountainous camp on the outskirts of Muzaffarabad. Due to poor living conditions and the monsoon rains, more Kazakhs and their livestock died daily. In April 1942, with the help of local Muslims, the Kazakhs were allowed to move to Gari Habibullah, and then Ternova village, where Indian Muslims hosted them. Nevertheless, additional Kazakhs died from illness, poor diet, and the warm climate. The remaining Kazakhs were granted residence permits, and with the help of regional nawabs, resettled elsewhere, with most eventually ending up in Pakistan after the Partition of India in 1947.

Distribution

By province

By county
(Only includes counties or county-equivalents containing >1% of county population.)

Culture
Some Kazakhs are nomadic herders and raise sheep, goats, cattle, and horses. These nomadic Kazakhs migrate seasonally in search of pasture for their animals. During the summer the Kazakhs live in yurts, while in winter they settle and live in modest houses made of adobe or cement blocks. Others live in urban areas and tend to be highly educated and hold much influence in integrated communities. The Islam practiced by the Kazakhs in China contains many elements of shamanism, ancestor worship, and other traditional beliefs and practices.

Notable Kazakh Chinese
Osman Batur (1899–1951) – Kazakh chieftain who fought both for and against the Nationalist Chinese government in the 1940s and early 1950s
Dalelkhan Sugirbayev (1906–1949) – Kazakh chieftain who fought against the Nationalist Chinese government and sought to join the Chinese Communists in 1949
Qazhyghumar Shabdanuly (1925–2011) – Kazakh Chinese political activist and author writing in Kazakh language. For more than forty years, Shabdanuly was imprisoned by the People's Republic of China for his political views.
Ashat Kerimbay – Chinese politician
Mukhtar Kul-Mukhammed – politician and public figure of Kazakhstan; First Deputy Chairman of "Nur Otan" party
Janabil Jänäbil Smağululı – Chinese politician
Mayra Muhammad-kyzy (Maira Kerey) – opera singer. She was the first Kazakh at the Parisian Grand Opera, and is an Honored Artist of the Republic.
Mamer – folk singer
Rayzha Alimjan – Kazakh Chinese actress and model
Xiakaini Aerchenghazi – speed skater who competed in the 2018 Winter Olympics
Rehanbai Talabuhan – speed skater who competed in the 2018 Winter Olympics
Adake Ahenaer – speed skater
Yeljan Shinar – footballer currently playing as a defender for Shenzhen
Yerjet Yerzat – Chinese footballer for Chongqing Dangdai Lifan FC
Yeerlanbieke Katai – freestyle wrestler; bronze medals winner at the 2014 Asian Games, and competed in the 2016 Summer Olympics
Jumabieke Tuerxun – mixed martial arts fighter; he previously fought as a Bantamweight in the Ultimate Fighting Championship
Kanat Islam – boxer who won bronze medals at the 2008 Summer Olympics, 2007 World Championships, and the 2006 Asian Games
Yushan Nijiati – amateur boxer; bronze medal winner at the 2007 World Amateur Boxing Championships in the 91 kg division
Tuohetaerbieke Tanglatihan – amateur boxer; competed in the men's middleweight event at the 2020 Summer Olympics
Walihan Sailike – Greco-Roman wrestler; bronze medal winner in the 60 kg event at the 2018 World Wrestling Championships, and bronze medal winner in the 2020 Summer Olympics
Nazaerbieke Bieken – pro cyclist

See also
Kazakh exodus from Xinjiang
Kyrgyz in China
2020 Dungan–Kazakh ethnic clashes

Notes

References

External links
Map of Kazakh share by county

 
China
Xinjiang
Ethnic groups officially recognized by China
 
Muslim communities of China